"Elstree" is a  song by the Buggles from their debut album, The Age of Plastic. It was the fourth and final single from the album, released on 27 October 1980. It was written by Trevor Horn and Geoff Downes.

Music and lyrics

"Elstree" is a tribute to the U.K. film studios Elstree Studios. It follows the story of a failed actor who, according to Wave Maker Magazine, is "taking up a more regular position behind the scenes and looking back at his life in regret." The song is 4 minutes and 32 seconds long, and is played at a BPM of 136. Geoff Downes performed an old-sounding grand piano and a minimoog in the song to emulate an oboe.

Release and version history
The single was released on 7" vinyl via Island Records across Europe and Japan. It was not given an America release. In the UK, the single was manufactured and distributed by EMI Records Ltd. The single was also issued in Brazil through Island Records and Ariola, which was the umbrella company in Brazil for Island Records at the time. For the single, the song was edited down by half a minute in comparison to the album version of the song. Despite this, the UK version of the single still dubbed the song "(Full-length Album Version)" on the A-side of the vinyl. The single included the B-side "Johnny on the Monorail (A Very Different Version)" which was written by Downes and Horn. As the title suggested, the song is a different version of the closing album track of The Age of Plastic. The version was originally exclusive to the single before it appeared as a bonus track on the 2000 remastered re-issue of The Age of Plastic album, amongst other re-issues of the album.

The majority of the releases of the single featured the same track listing, however the Japanese issue of the single, released on 21 July 1980 as a promotional release only, featured the full album version of "Elstree" and not the single version, whilst the B-side was "Island" which was originally the B-side to the band's second single "Living in the Plastic Age" from 1980.

Most issues of the single featured a full colour sleeve with artwork of a camera. The Japanese release used different artwork, using an alternate design of the drawing of the duo first seen as the artwork on their 1979 debut single "Video Killed the Radio Star".

Additionally, a promotional single was released in the UK which featured "Elstree (Special DJ Version)" - a three and a half minute version of the song. This version was originally exclusive to the single but would later see release as a bonus track on the 2010 Japanese CD re-release of The Age of Plastic, along with the single version of "Elstree". The promotional single still featured the usual full colour sleeve.

Gigi D'Agostino reused parts of the song's melodic structure for his 1999 hit "Another Way".

The song was parodied in the 1983 Central TV 'Christmas Tape', with reference made about the move from the ATV Elstree Studios to the then new Lenton Lane Studios in Nottingham - a voice-over from an advert for Tunes menthol sweets is played at the end: 'A Second Class Return to Nottingham, please'.

Reception
The song peaked at #55 in the UK singles chart and lasted in the Top 100 for a total of four weeks. It was the band's final Top 100 release in the UK.

The Independent, on 3 October 2010, spoke of the song in a review of The Buggles' live performance "The Lost Gig" in London, where the author Simon Price stated "The Age of Plastic, played in order, and accompanied by films generally involving old footage of things that once, like the songs, felt impossibly futuristic. Then again, minor hits such as "Clean Clean" and "Elstree" sound radiantly relevant now." Krinein magazine reviewed the album in 2003, where writer L. Vincent stated "The great quality of The Age of Plastic is due to a whole in the spirit and the musical success of individual 'Video Killed the Radio Star'. For example, the titles "Living in the Plastic Age", "Kid Dynamo", "Elstree" and "Johnny On The Monorail" are quite as effective in their melodies, their rhythms and their harmonies."

Nicholas Baker of Napster spoke of the song in a review of the album, stating ''"Don't overlook this '80s pop classic. Production deity Trevor Horn had more in him than just "Video Killed the Radio Star." His considerable songwriting prowess is also evident on "Plastic Age," "Elstree" (a tribute to the famed U.K. film studios) and "Clean Clean."

Music video

A music video was filmed featuring Trevor Horn as a BBC janitor cleaning a cemetery set on a sound stage as he recalls his days as a bit player in Elstree Studio b-films. Intercut with scenes of black and white sword fighting and retro movie scenes are included in the video. As Horn reminisces, black-and-white footage of his "films" play, illustrating the various roles he recalls in the song.

Performances
On 28 September 2010, The Buggles reunited to play their first full-length live concert. The event was billed as "The Lost Gig" and took place at "Ladbroke Grove's Supperclub", Notting Hill, London, and was a fund raiser with all earnings going to the Royal Hospital for Neuro-disability. Except "Video Killed the Radio Star" and "The Plastic Age" which the band had previously played together, "The Lost Gig" saw the first live performances of all songs from The Age of Plastic, which included "Elstree".

Track listing
7" Single
"Elstree" - 4:05
"Johnny on the Monorail (A Very Different Version)" - 3:54

7" Single (Japanese promo release)
"Elstree" - 4:27
"Island" - 3:31

7" Single (UK promotional release)
"Elstree (Special DJ Version)" - 3:35
"Johnny on the Monorail (A Very Different Version)" - 3:54

Chart positions

Personnel
Geoff Downes – keyboards, drums, percussion, producer
Trevor Horn – vocals, bass guitar, guitar, producer
Paul Robinson - drums
Richard James Burgess – drums
John Sinclair - mixing

References

1980 singles
The Buggles songs
Songs written by Trevor Horn
Songs written by Geoff Downes
Island Records singles
1980 songs